Mariam Al Maadeed (also written AlMa'adeed) is a Qatari national and a Professor in Physics and Materials Science at Qatar University.

Biography 
Mariam Al Maadeed is the current Vice President for Research and Graduate Studies at Qatar University. Al Maadeed was the Director of the Center for Advanced Materials (CAM), and founder of the Masters program of Materials Science and Technology, both at Qatar University. Al Madeed's research is in the field of polymer characterization and structure, nanocomposites and nanotechnology techniques.

Membership of editorial boards 
 Founder and Associate Editor-in-Chief of Emergent Materials (Springer).
Member of Research Council Committee, Quality and Management Committee and New Reform Committee.
 Lead Guest Editor: International Journal of Polymer Science Surface Modification of Polymer Nano-composite Materials: Techniques, Characterization, and Applications, 2016.

Awards and honors 
 Mentorship Award in the Leadership Excellence for Women Awards (LEWA).
 AL-Bairaq- World Innovation Summit for Education (WISE), 2015.
 Gulf Petrochemicals & Chemicals Association (GPCA) Plastic Excellence Award 2014.
 Appreciative and Incentivizing State award on Science 2014.
 Outstanding Faculty Service Award.- Qatar University,  2013–2014.
 State of Qatar encouragement Award in Physics (2010- 2011).
 Outstanding Faculty Service Award – Special award -  Qatar University (2011-2012).

Patents 
 Reinforced Polymer Composites from Recycled Plastic.
 Methods for Graphene production.

Books 
 Flexible and Stretchable Electronic Composites, Authors: Ponnamma, D., Sadasivuni, K.K., Wan, C., Thomas, S., Editors: Al-Ali AlMa'adeed, Mariam (Ed.), 2015, 
 Biopolymer Composites in Electronics, Authors: Kishor Kumar Sadasivuni,  John-John Cabibihan, Deepalekshmi Ponnamma,  Mariam Ali S A Al-Maadeed,  Jaehwan Kim, Print , Electronic 
 Polyolefin Compounds and Materials, Fundamental and Industrial Applications, Editors: Mariam AlMaadeed, Igor Krupa, Springer. 
Polymer Science and Innovative Applications: Materials, Techniques, and Future Developments. Editors: Mariam AlMaadeed, Deepalekshmi Ponnamma, Marcelo Carignano. Elsevier. .

References

External links 
 Office of VP for Research

Qatari scientists
People from Doha
Year of birth missing (living people)
Living people
Academic staff of Qatar University
Women materials scientists and engineers
Qatari engineers